Lee Ju-ho (born 17 February 1961) is a South Korean economist and a professor at the KDI School of Public Policy and Management. He serves as Deputy Prime Minister and Education Minister under President Yoon Suk-yeol since November 7, 2022. He previously served as Minister of Education, Science and Technology from 2010 to 2013 under President Lee Myung-bak.

Lee holds three degrees in economics - a bachelor's and a master's from Seoul National University and a doctorate from Cornell University.

References 

Living people
1961 births
People from Daegu
Seoul National University alumni
Cornell University alumni
South Korean economists
South Korean academics
Members of the National Assembly (South Korea)
Deputy Prime Ministers of South Korea
Education ministers of South Korea
21st-century South Korean politicians